Louis Peter Wenzell (February 10, 1888 – August 13, 1955) was the head men's basketball coach at the United States Naval Academy during the 1912–13 NCAA men's basketball season. In his only season, Wenzell guided the Midshipmen to a perfect 9–0 record. The team was retroactively named the 1912–13 national champion by the Helms Athletic Foundation and the Premo-Porretta Power Poll. He had been a player at Navy just prior to taking over the team for one season.

Wenzell became a rear admiral in the United States Navy. He served in both World War I and World War II.

Head coaching record

References

1888 births
1955 deaths
American men's basketball coaches
American men's basketball players
Navy Midshipmen men's basketball coaches
Navy Midshipmen men's basketball players
United States Navy personnel of World War I
United States Navy personnel of World War II